John Jackett may refer to:

John Jackett (politician) (1912–2003), member of the New South Wales Legislative Assembly
Edward Jackett (Edward John Jackett, 1878–1935), known as John Jackett, English rugby union and rugby league player